Samjiyŏn Airport  is an airport in Samjiyon City, Ryanggang Province, North Korea.

The airport is located near Baekdu Mountain. Tour groups fly to the airport for scheduled journeys to this significant landmark and to see the birthplace of Kim Jong-il. All tours to the area will include a trip here.

There is a high presence of military equipment at this airport, there are large numbers of older Soviet jets such as MiG-15's lined up in sidings next to the runway and many utility vehicles/jeeps. Whether or not these are operational is unknown, but highly unlikely given their apparent condition.

The only flights to this airport are from Pyongyang Sunan International Airport and served by the country's only airline: Air Koryo.

The airport was built in the 1980s to accommodate a ski center planned by a South Korean company. The venture failed, and Samjiyŏn airport now sits in a deserted location.

Facilities 

The airfield has a single asphalt runway 07/25, measuring 10750 x 197 feet (3277 x 60 m). It has a full-length parallel taxiway. Entrances to underground bunkers are clearly visible in satellite photography of the base.

Airline and destination

References

External links 

 360° panorama of Samjiyon Airport
 Selection of photographs in and around Samjiyon Airport

Airports in North Korea
Buildings and structures in Ryanggang Province
1980s establishments in North Korea